The Hershey's Milk Chocolate Bar (commonly called the Hershey's Bar, or more simply the Hershey Bar) is a flagship chocolate bar manufactured by The Hershey Company. Hershey refers to it as "The Great American Chocolate Bar". The Hershey Milk Chocolate Bar was first sold in 1900.

History of Hershey chocolate bars
Hershey chocolate bars had their origin in Milton Hershey's first successful confectionery business, Lancaster Caramel Company, which was founded in 1886. After seeing German chocolate manufacturing machinery at the World's Columbian Exposition of 1893 in Chicago, Hershey decided to go into the chocolate making business. After purchasing the chocolate processing machinery, Hershey began by applying chocolate coatings to the caramels. The next year, 1894, Hershey founded the Hershey Chocolate Company and incorporated it as a subsidiary of the Lancaster Caramel Company. The Hershey Chocolate Company developed its own line of chocolate products, marketed as "sweet chocolate novelties" to distinguish them from unsweetened baking chocolate. After developing the Hershey process to mass-produce chocolate in 1899, Hershey sold the Lancaster Caramel Company in August of the year 1900, and kept the chocolate manufacturing business. In November of that same year, Hershey began to produce and sell the Hershey chocolate bar.

Varieties of Hershey's Bars

Hershey's milk chocolate
The Hershey Process milk chocolate in these bars uses fresh milk delivered directly from local farms. The process was developed by Milton Hershey and produced the first mass-produced chocolate in the United States. As a result, the Hershey flavor is widely recognized in the United States, the Philippines, and to a minor extent in Canada, where British-produced chocolates were commonly sold, but less so internationally, especially in areas where European chocolates are more widely available. The process is a company and trade secret, but experts speculate that the milk is partially lipolyzed. This produces butyric acid, a compound found in substances such as Parmesan cheese which stabilizes the milk from further fermentation. This flavor gives the product a  "tangy" taste that the US public has come to associate with the taste of chocolate, to the point that other US manufacturers often add butyric acid to their milk chocolates. In Canada this led to Hershey introducing a reformulated Canadian bar in 1983.

Starting in 2006, Hershey has added polyglycerol polyricinoleate (PGPR) to their chocolate, except for the traditional plain milk chocolate Hershey's Kisses. In 2015, Hershey announced they would begin removing PGPR from the rest of their chocolate. Artificial vanillin was also removed in 2015. Hershey did remove PGPR from some of their chocolate bars, but in April 2019 started putting it back in Hershey's Milk Chocolate with Almonds full size bar, and plain milk chocolate bars, and never removed it from Symphony milk chocolate and other products. Hershey does not claim to use vanilla in their chocolate, only natural flavor, which may be the same chemical as the artificial one it replaces, except created from a natural source through several processes.

Other varieties and details

In addition to the standard Milk Chocolate and Milk Chocolate with Almonds varieties, Hershey's produces several other chocolate bars in various flavors: Special Dark chocolate, Cookies 'N' Creme, Symphony (both Milk Chocolate and Almond Toffee), Mr. Goodbar (with peanuts), and Krackel (with crisped rice). Nine flavors were available for limited periods: Double Chocolate, Nut Lovers, Twosomes Reese's Pieces, Cookies 'N' Chocolate, Cookies 'N' Mint, Strawberries 'n' Creme, Raspberries 'n' Creme, Twosomes Heath, and Twosomes Whoppers. All flavors have between 210 and 230 calories per standard-sized bar.

The Kashruth Division of the Union of Orthodox Jewish Congregations of America approves all flavors for consumption by observant Jews, with OU Kosher status.

The largest Hershey's bar commercially available weighs  and costs US$69.99 on Hershey's website.

A gold variant with pretzels and peanuts was sold for its 100th anniversary.

References

External links

 

Products introduced in 1900
Chocolate bars
The Hershey Company brands
Kosher food
Brand name confectionery